Monika Kilnarová was the defending champion, but lost to Dejana Radanović in the first round. 

Barbora Krejčíková won the title, defeating wildcard Denisa Allertová 6–2, 6–3 in the final.

Seeds

Draw

Finals

Top half

Bottom half

References

Main Draw

Macha Lake Open - Singles